MoeTar is an American, Bay Area, California-based rock group, founded by singer Moorea Dickason ("Moe") and bassist Tarik Ragab ("Tar"). Moorea and Tarik previously worked together in the more politically charged funk/pop band No Origin.

History
Moorea and Tarik formed the band in 2008 with Matthew Heulitt (Narada Michael Walden, Zigaboo Modeliste) on guitar, David Flores (Lauryn Hill, John Santos, Carne Cruda) on drums, and Bob Crawford on keyboards. Early on Bob left the band, and was replaced by Matt Lebofsky (miRthkon, Faun Fables, Secret Chiefs 3).

With the lineup in place, the band entered a period of intense rehearsals and shows. Their first gig (May 17, 2009) was performing near the finish line at the annual Bay to Breakers race in San Francisco. They also performed at the annual Burning Man Decompression Festival, and played the opening slot at the final show of Sleepytime Gorilla Museum.

In 2010, they recorded their debut CD From These Small Seeds with engineer Dan Rathbun (of Sleepytime Gorilla Museum, Idiot Flesh). The album was self-released in July, 2010. Papa J of  CalProg ranked it the number 4 best album of 2010.

In 2011, they signed to Magna Carta Records who re-released From These Small Seeds on CD in early 2012 with different artwork.

In 2013, they started recording their second CD Entropy of the Century which was released in August 2014. Jonathan Herrera (Zigaboo Modeliste, Miguel Migs, Cathedrals) helped contribute to the recording process of this record and then officially joined the band, also on keyboards.

Band members

 Moorea Dickason – vocals
 Tarik Ragab – bass, backing vocals
 Matthew Heulitt – guitar, backing vocals
 Matt Lebofsky – keyboards, backing vocals
 David M. Flores – drums
 Jonathan Herrera - keyboards (since 2014)

Discography

Albums
From These Small Seeds (2012, Magna Carta Records #MA-9111)
Entropy of the Century (2014, Magna Carta Records #MA-9118-2)
The Final Four (EP) (2018, self-release on Bandcamp)

References

External links
MoeTar - official website
Papa J's Top 10 albums of 2010

American experimental musical groups
Musical groups from Oakland, California
Magna Carta Records artists